Lalu Bazar (also Romanized as Lālū Bāzār and Lālū-ye Bāzār; also known as Lāleh Bāzār) is a village in Polan Rural District, Polan District, Chabahar County, Sistan and Baluchestan Province, Iran. At the 2006 census, its population was 1,070, in 183 families.

References 

Populated places in Chabahar County